René Coicaud (25 August 1927 – 1 October 2000) was a French fencer. He won a silver medal in the team foil event at the 1956 Summer Olympics.

References

External links
 

1927 births
2000 deaths
People from Libourne
French male foil fencers
Olympic fencers of France
Fencers at the 1956 Summer Olympics
Olympic silver medalists for France
Olympic medalists in fencing
Medalists at the 1956 Summer Olympics
Sportspeople from Gironde
20th-century French people